Co–Star is an American astrological social networking service founded in 2017, and headquartered in New York City. Users enter the date, time and place they were born to receive an astrological chart and daily horoscopes that they can compare to those of their friends.



History
Founder and CEO Banu Guler came up with the idea for the app after she gifted a friend's child an astrological chart that became a surprise hit at the baby shower. In 2019, Co–Star raised a $5.2 million seed round from Maveron, Aspect, and 14W, following a $750,000 pre-seed from Female Founders Fund in early 2018. In January 2020, Co–Star for Android was launched to a 120,000-person waitlist—two years after their iOS app was launched. In April 2021, Co–Star announced their $15 million Series A, led by Spark Capital. As of that date, Co–Star has more than 20 million downloads and has been downloaded by a quarter of all young women ages 18–25 in the U.S. In recent years, Guler has come under fire for Co-Star's provocative horoscope notifications, which she defended as a way to prepare users for the worst-case scenario.

Features 
Co–Star employs artificial intelligence (AI) to analyze publicly accessible NASA JPL data and find patterns in a user’s transits. Co–Star’s algorithm maps human-written snippets of text to planetary movements to display personalized content for each user. That content has been called “slightly robotic,” “wildly beautiful,” “truly insane," “brutally honest,” and compared to “a free therapy session.”

See also
 Astrology
 NASA
 Timeline of social media

References

External links
Official website 

2017 software
Internet properties established in 2017
Android (operating system) software
IOS software
Freeware
Mobile applications
Social networking services
Youth culture